KRGV-TV (channel 5) is a television station licensed to Weslaco, Texas, United States, serving the Lower Rio Grande Valley as an affiliate of ABC. The station is owned by the Manship family of Baton Rouge, Louisiana through Mobile Video Tapes, Inc., which often does business as KRGV-TV Corporation. KRGV-TV's studios are located on East Expressway (I-2/US 83) in Weslaco, and its transmitter is located in Santa Maria, Texas.

History

KRGV joined as a primary NBC affiliate in 1954, sharing ABC programming with KGBT-TV. The original owner of the station was O. L. Taylor, who, in 1956, sold half of the station's interest to future President Lyndon B. Johnson and his wife, Lady Bird Johnson's Texas Broadcasting Company. The Johnsons owned the station until 1961, until they sold to Kenco Enterprises. Mobile Video Tapes, which was formed by the Manship family, purchased the station from Kenco three years later. On April 12, 1976, KRGV became the first NBC affiliate to switch to ABC during a push by the network to attract new, stronger affiliates.  One year later, sister station WBRZ in Baton Rouge followed suit. From 1976 to 1981, CBS affiliate KGBT would carry NBC programming on a secondary basis. NBC wouldn't return full time to the Rio Grande Valley until KVEO-TV signed on in 1981.

In 1995, KRGV added a secondary affiliation with UPN. The following year, UPN programming moved to KVEO.

On August 24, 2009, KRGV extended its 10 p.m. newscast by 30 minutes. KRGV was one of six ABC affiliates to have hour-long 10 p.m. newscasts, along with KOAT-TV in Albuquerque, KITV in Honolulu, WISN-TV in Milwaukee, WEAR-TV in Pensacola, Florida and KSTP-TV in Saint Paul, Minnesota.

On September 9, 2009, KRGV began broadcasting in HD, and that same year, the channel rebranded itself to Channel 5 News.

In September 2010, KRGV began expanded Channel 5 News This Morning by a half hour, pushing the start time to 4:30 a.m.

In April 2011, KRGV expanded their morning newscast to Saturdays at 8 a.m. and Sundays at 9 a.m.

In October 2012, KRGV redesigned its website and logo, eliminating the "KRGV" ribbon underneath the logo, and integrating the ABC logo in its full form.

In 2017, KRGV ended with the weather Channel 5.4 First Warn Doppler Radar.

On January 1, 2018, KRGV-DT2 ended its This TV affiliation and became a bilingual independent station.

On November 2, 2020, KRGV's set was redesigned with new graphics and music.

On January 4, 2021, KRGV ended its contract with MeTV, to become an independent station known as Somos El Valle, which was previously seen on DT2, before it became an Azteca América affiliate. MeTV can now be seen on KRZG-CD 35.4.

Programming

Syndicated programming
In addition to the ABC network schedule, syndicated programming on KRGV-TV includes Live with Kelly and Ryan, Access Hollywood, Family Feud and Inside Edition among others.

In November 2004, KRGV, along with many other ABC affiliates in the country, opted not to air the movie Saving Private Ryan when the network broadcast it uncut on Veterans Day.

Local programming
Local programming aired by KRGV includes Dance with Sunshine and At Home with Ine.

Preemptions and delays
For many years, KRGV aired syndicated programming leading back into ABC's late night block and tape delayed the latter to accommodate whatever syndicated programming aired at that time. Married... with Children consistently aired at 10:30 following the newscast since it first began airing in syndication, while the rest of the late night schedule shifted around through the years. This caused the ABC program Nightline to air as late as an hour and a half after its network slot and Jimmy Kimmel Live! as many as two hours after its network slot in some years. By the 2010s, both Nightline and Jimmy Kimmel Live! air back to back as they do across many affiliates, but were tape-delayed 30 minutes in favor of an extension of the 10 p.m. news known as Channel 5 News at 10:30. Because of the delay, both Nightline and Kimmel were broadcast in standard definition. KRGV did not yet have the capability to record the two programs in HD for later rebroadcast. This all changed in 2009, when KRGV began recording network and syndicated programming in HD, enabling both Nightline and Kimmel to be seen in HD.

In January 2018, KRGV's contract with Tribune Broadcasting's Antenna TV ended, and the station moved its 10:30 p.m. newscast as part of its newly launched and locally programmed independent station known as "Somos El Valle", which includes a mix of Spanish and English content. This allowed the station to air Kimmel and Nightline at their regular time slots as scheduled by the network.

Because of the station's midday newscast which airs at noon, KRGV has aired GMA3: What You Need To Know on a day-behind basis.

Technical information

Subchannels
The station's digital signal is multiplexed:

Analog-to-digital conversion
KRGV's broadcasts became digital-only, effective June 12, 2009.

References

External links

Television channels and stations established in 1954
1954 establishments in Texas
ABC network affiliates
Television stations in the Lower Rio Grande Valley